The 2021–22 UIC Flames men's basketball team represented the University of Illinois at Chicago in the 2021–22 NCAA Division I men's basketball season. The Flames, led by second-year head coach Luke Yaklich, played their home games at Credit Union 1 Arena in Chicago, Illinois as members of the Horizon League.

On January 26, 2022, UIC announced that this would be the last season for the team in the Horizon League as they would join the Missouri Valley Conference on July 1, 2022.

Previous season
In a season limited due to the ongoing COVID-19 pandemic, the Flames finished the 2020–21 season 9–13, 6–10 in Horizon League play to finish in a tie for 10th place. As the No. 11 seed in the Horizon League tournament, they lost to Youngstown State in the first round.

Offseason

Departures

Incoming transfers

Recruiting class

Roster

Schedule and results

|-
!colspan=12 style=| Exhibition

|-
!colspan=9 style=| Regular season

|-
!colspan=9 style=| Horizon League tournament
|-

|-

Source

References

UIC Flames men's basketball seasons
Uic
Uic
Uic